Chester R. Crain (March 15, 1914 – December 13, 1984) served as mayor of Compton, California during a period of enormous transition.

Biography
Chester Russell Crain was a native of Des Moines, Iowa. He was the third of at least nine children born to Carl R. and Lillie (Smith) Crain. In the 1920s, the family moved to California and settled in the Signal Hill area.

He was employed as track and field coach and a professor of English at Compton Community College.  In 1953, Crain was elected to the Compton City Council, representing the 2nd District. He became the city's mayor after the resignation of Congressman-elect Del Clawson in 1963. He served as mayor of Compton, California during a tumultuous period in the city's history.  Unlike some of his predecessors that were uncomfortable with the town's growing black population, Crain attempted to build bridges and make Compton a model of integration.

However, just a few months after his re-election in 1965, the Watts Riots broke out in the adjacent community in Los Angeles. He was an outspoken critic of Los Angeles Mayor Sam Yorty and accused him of neglecting the predominantly African American community.  He was once quoted as saying, "Has he ever been to Watts?"

In the wake of the riots many of the remaining whites left Compton and moved to new suburbs in nearby Los Angeles County communities such as Lakewood or to Orange County, a few miles south of Compton.

During his tenure, Compton's city council became majority African American.  In 1969, he did not seek re-election and watched as City Councilman Douglas F. Dollarhide became the city's first black chief executive. By that time, the population of Compton was roughly 65% black.

After leaving office, Crain moved to the northern part of the state.  He died in the Fresno, California area at the age of 70. He was living in Tulare County at the time of his death.

References

1914 births
1984 deaths
Politicians from Des Moines, Iowa
20th-century American educators
Mayors of Compton, California
20th-century American politicians
People from Signal Hill, California
People from Tulare County, California